Tooned In is an American game show that premiered on Nickelodeon on February 8, 2021.

Premise
In Tooned In, an animated A.I. robot named Nicky (voiced by Rama Vallury) hosts a game show where kid contestants compete in a battle of Nickelodeon cartoon knowledge for the chance to be named the night's big winner and take home exciting prizes. Each episode features three kids who must solve animation questions across slime-filled rounds of trivia until only one contestant is left in the competition. The final kid will then be declared the episode's big winner and move on to a special prize round to compete against Nicky and climb the robot's motherboard for a chance to win the $1,000 grand prize.

Gameplay
The game is divided into two rounds; in the first round, questions are asked on the buzzers and are worth 10 points each, with 10 points deducted for a wrong answer. In season two, five categories are shown for round one, with Nicky choosing the first and the player with the last correct answer choosing the next. Also in season two, questions are worth 100 points, with none being deducted for a wrong answer. In season one and briefly in season two, the players who failed to answer correctly got slimed after each question. In season two, every player gets slimed, usually after the category ends. The last question of the round is "The Impossible Question" where the three contestants are usually shown a picture or video with a certain number of objects and have to secretly enter a guess as to how many there are. Whoever is the closest, either high or low, receives 20 points (200 in season two).

In round two, questions are worth 20 points (200 in season two), up or down. In season one, there was a game that almost always appeared in round two called "Cartoon Cosplay" in which a man named "the Nicktoon Nickgoon" dressed up as a Nicktoon character and asked questions usually related to the character. In season two, the first game of the round is a stunt that the players must complete, in order to answer a question. The main game ends with a speed round called "All The Answers" where Nicky asks 10 questions while 12 possible answers are revealed on a monitor to his left. In the case of a tiebreaker, one more question is asked. Correct answers are worth +/-25 points (200 in season two), with the winner moving on to the bonus round.

Climb or Slime 
The contestant has 60 seconds to answer 5 dual-choice questions, one on each level of the game board. The first correct answer is worth $100, while later correct answers increase by $50. When the contestant answers a question correctly, they move up to the next level on the board, going to one of the shows connected by a line. For every incorrect answer, the contestant has the option to either "Slime Reset" (being slimed, but being allowed to remain with the same show) and continue or move onto another show on the same level. The final category is chosen by the contestant before the round begins; as it is the only category on the top level, an incorrect answer automatically results in a "Slime Reset." If the contestant completes the game in 60 seconds, they win the $1,000 grand prize. If they fail to finish in time, they leave with the total amount won at that point, e.g., four correct answers earn the contestant $700 ($100+$150+$200+$250).

Production
On January 29, 2021, the show was officially announced and premiered on February 8, 2021. On September 9, 2021, it was announced that Nickelodeon renewed the series for a second season, which premiered on September 17, 2021, with Jerry Trainor as co-host.

Episodes
Winners are highlighted in bold.

Series overview

Season 1 (2021)

Season 2 (2021–22)

Ratings
 

| link2             = #Season 2 (2021–22)
| episodes2         = 17
| start2            = 
| end2              = 
| startrating2      = 0.29
| endrating2        = 
| viewers2          = |2}} 
}}

References

External links
 
 

Nickelodeon game shows
2020s Nickelodeon original programming
2021 American television series debuts
2020s American children's game shows
English-language television shows